Emmaus College is an independent  Roman Catholic comprehensive co-educational secondary day school, that serves the eastern suburbs of Melbourne, Victoria, Australia. The school has a Main Campus (years 7, 8, 10, 11 and 12) in Vermont South and a Year 9 campus in Burwood.  It has a population of approximately 1,400 students and slowly growing. Emmaus College is a member of the Eastern Independent Schools of Melbourne (EISM) Sporting Association (joined in 1989).
Emmaus was used as external shots for Erinsborough High in Neighbours.

History 
Emmaus College was established in February 1980 through the merger of St Thomas More's Boys College in Vermont South (1968–1979) and the all-girl  Chavoin  College in Burwood (1966–1979). Emmaus College was the first co-educational secondary college in the Archdiocese of Melbourne to be formed from the union of an all-boys school with an all-girls school.

Academics 
Emmaus College is the best performed Roman Catholic co-educational secondary school in Victoria.

Extracurricular activities

Sport 
Emmaus College is a member of the Eastern Independent Schools of Melbourne (EISM).

EISM premierships 
Emmaus College has won the following EISM senior premierships.

Premierships won prior to 1980 were done so by the pre-amalgamation schools Chavoin College and St Thomas More College.

Combined:
 Athletics - 1982

Boys:

 Athletics (3) - 1966, 1971, 1973

 Badminton - 2017
 Basketball - 2020
 Cross Country (6) - 1970, 1971, 1972, 1973, 1974, 1975
 Hockey (4) - 2015, 2017, 2018, 2021, 2022
 Soccer (4) - 2015, 2017, 2018, 2019, 2022
Soccer five-a-side (2) - 2016, 2021
 Softball - 2018
 Swimming (3) - 1973, 1974, 1975
 Tennis (2) - 2017, 2021

Girls:

 Basketball (3) - 1981, 2016, 2020, 2022
Cricket Super 8 - 2021, 2022
 Football - 2019
 Hockey (2) - 2012, 2013
 Indoor cricket (2) - 2019, 2020
 Netball - 1978, 2022
 Soccer - 2018
Soccer five-a-side - 2021
 Softball - 2020, 2022
 Tennis (3) - 1977, 2018, 2019

Emmaus Year 9 EISM Premierships

Year 9 Boys:
 Basketball (2) - 2021, 2022
 Football - 2011
 Indoor Cricket - 2011
 Indoor Soccer - 2011
 Soccer - 2011
 Table Tennis - 2010

Year 9 Girls:
 Badminton - 2011
 Basketball (2) - 2021, 2022
 Cricket - 2022
 Netball - 2022
 Soccer - 2011

Houses
Emmaus College is divided into four houses each bearing the last name of a notable figure in the History of the Catholic Church.
 Chavoin House is named after Chavoin College (1967–1979), the school on the Burwood site prior to Emmaus College. This school was named after Jeanne-Marie Chavoin, foundress of the Marist Sisters.
 Colin House is named after Jean-Claude Colin, the founder of the Marist Fathers.
 More House is named in recognition of St. Thomas More College (1968–1979) which was the original school on the Vermont South (formerly Forest Hill) site, run by the Christian Brothers. The school was named after Thomas More (1478–1535), a legendary figure in English history.
 Rice House is named after Edmund Rice (1762-1844) founder of the Christian Brothers.

The fours house are:

  Chavion (Red)
  Colin (Blue)
  More (Yellow)
  Rice (Green)

Notable alumni
 Tess Flintoff – cricketer, Melbourne Stars
 Natalie Gauci – musician
 Catherine King – federal MP and government minister
 Ryan Moloney – actor
 Tony Robinson – politician, elected as the state member for Mitcham 1997-2010 and a Minister in the Brumby Government
 Gabrielle Williams – politician, elected as state member for Dandenong in 2014

References

External links 
 Emmaus College Website

Catholic secondary schools in Melbourne
Educational institutions established in 1980
1980 establishments in Australia
Buildings and structures in the City of Whitehorse